"Modern Moral Philosophy" is an article on moral philosophy by G. E. M. Anscombe, originally published in the journal Philosophy, vol. 33, no. 124 (January 1958).

The article has influenced the emergence of contemporary virtue ethics, especially through the work of Alasdair MacIntyre.  Notably, the term "consequentialism" was first coined in this paper.

Theses
The author presents three theses:
 "It is not profitable for us at present to do moral philosophy; that should be laid aside at any rate until we have an adequate philosophy of psychology, in which we are conspicuously lacking."
 "Concepts of obligation, and duty — moral obligation and moral duty, that is to say — and of what is morally right and wrong, and of the moral sense of "ought," ought to be jettisoned if this is psychologically possible; because they are survivals, or derivatives from survivals, from an earlier conception of ethics which no longer generally survives, and are only harmful without it."
 "The differences between the well-known English writers on moral philosophy from Sidgwick to the present day are of little importance."

Criticism 
John Wardle argued that Anscombe misrepresented Henry Sidgwick's understanding of the concept of humility when she concludes that it is "a species of untruthfulness".

See also
"The Schizophrenia of Modern Ethical Theories"

References

Sources 
"Virtue Ethics" – Internet Encyclopedia of Philosophy

Further reading 
Virtue Ethics, edited by Roger Crisp and Michael Slote, Oxford, 1997. 
Alasdair MacIntyre, After Virtue: A Study in Moral Theory, London, 1985 (2nd ed.). .

1958 documents
Academic journal articles
Works by Elizabeth Anscombe
Works originally published in Philosophy (journal)
1958 essays
Ethics essays